The Spoils is a debut full-length studio album by Nika Roza Danilova, better known as American singer-songwriter Zola Jesus, released in July 2010 on Sacred Bones Records. To the LP version's original 10 tracks the CD (15 tracks) adds five songs: two from "Soeur Sewer" and three from the "Poor Sons" 7-inch singles.

History 
The album, according to the sleeve note was "recorded in the womb of a Wisconsin winter, 2008/2009". Nika Rosa made it in her apartment and lo-fi standard of the sound had been criticized even by her parents. "They’re like ...why is the quality so bad? You need to get into a real studio!" she said in a Pitchfork interview.

Sound and structure 
The album's sound had a lot to do with the environment, according to its author: 
Some argued that the inclusion of the two earlier singles' material illustrated the development of the Zola Jesus sound. "The earlier singles are dirtier, sexier, more intense... Her voice, really, is the soul and core of the music," and on The Spoils she used "more reverb and single vocal tracks. I've never observed the loss of warmth and charm when switching to digital recording from analogue more apparently than here," remarked a Brainwashed reviewer. "I love weird power electronics and industrial music, but then I also really love intensely powerful melodic songs. Something like a Ronettes song hits you in such a different way than noise stuff. For me, the ideal is bringing both the experimental and the pop music in," Zola Jesus commented, noting that percussion played an important role in the album's structure too. "I will always have intense beats and have an epic sound structure," the singer said, speaking toLA Record.

Reception 
According to The Quietus, The Spoils "unfurled an epic sort of gloom-pop deliberately tarnished with lo-fidelity scuzz, but songs like "Clay Bodies" rose above the rubble thanks to Nika's huge delivery, full-hearted and powerful in a way that that melds a familiar diva dynamic to an abrasiveness practiced by scream queens like Diamanda Galas and Lydia Lunch. The Spoils (quoting The Fact magazine) "saw her master a unique vocabulary of drones, cavernous acoustics and rich, anachronistic vocal timbres buried within a dense layer of lo-fi grain that suggested that Zola Jesus had very much found her voice." A Boomkat reviewer pointed to "doom ridden, barely decipherable lyrics and emaciated drum machines somewhere between Siouxsie Sioux and Cold Cave" as the album's sound main feature. "The effect is a windswept and romantic scene of pop emotions wrung with blood curdling howls, bristling with synth electrics and booming with Robin Guthrie-esque drums. If you're susceptible to the likes of Cold Cave, PJ Harvey and classic 4AD moods, this will put you in your place," the writer concluded.

According to Pitchfork, as compared to earlier singles and EPs (which were "promising, with an immediately identifiable aesthetic" but "pulled in a few different directions, 
between structure and atmosphere, or vulnerable longing and stark, theatrical wailing") The Spoils is "a potent mix of layered and otherworldly vocals, muddy electronics, and storefront-church keyboards", full of tension, dynamics and raw emotion. "Spoils is compelling throughout, but the peak comes much later in its runtime, with 'Smirenye' and especially 'Clay Bodies', argues the reviewer.

Track listing

Tracks 11 and 12 were originally released as the "Soeur Sewer" 7" on Sacred Bones Records. Tracks 13 to 15 originally released as the Poor Sons 7" on Die Stasi Records.

Credits 
 Indra Dunis - artwork

References

2009 debut albums
Albums recorded in a home studio
Zola Jesus albums
Sacred Bones Records albums